The Third Thai–Lao Friendship Bridge over the Mekong is a bridge that connects Nakhon Phanom Province in Thailand with Thakhek, Khammouane Province in Laos.  The bridge's foundation stone was laid on 6 March 2009, and it opened for traffic on 11 November 2011. The bridge is 1,423 metres long and 13 metres wide.

The name "Third Thai-Lao Friendship Bridge" was previously also used to refer to the planned bridge from Chiang Khong, Thailand to Houayxay, Laos, but this bridge is now known as the Fourth Thai-Lao Friendship Bridge.

Traffic on the bridge drives on the left, as in Thailand, while traffic in Laos drives on the right; the lane-change is on the Laos side.

See also 
 First Thai-Lao Friendship Bridge
 Second Thai-Lao Friendship Bridge
 Fourth Thai–Lao Friendship Bridge
 Fifth Thai-Lao Friendship Bridge
 Sixth Thai-Lao Friendship Bridge
 Seventh Thai–Lao Friendship Bridge
 Transportation in Laos
 Transport in Thailand

References

External links 

Driving Across The Third Thai–Lao Friendship Bridge (Online Video)

Thai–Lao Friendship Bridge 03
Thai–Lao Friendship Bridge 03
Thai–Lao Friendship Bridge 03
Thai–Lao Friendship Bridge 03
Thai–Lao Friendship Bridge 03
Thai–Lao Friendship Bridge 03
Thai–Lao Friendship Bridge 03
Bridges completed in 2011